1st Stinger Battery   was an air defense unit of the United States Marine Corps.  When active, it was part of Marine Air Control Group 18 (MACG-18) and the 1st Marine Aircraft Wing (1st MAW) and was based at Marine Corps Air Station Futenma, Okinawa, Japan.   On December 7, 2006, Headquarters Marine Corps released a message stating that 1st Stinger would be deactivated during 2007.  The battery was decommissioned on September 28, 2007.

Mission

To provide close-in, low altitude, surface-to-air weapons fires in defense of Marine Air-Ground Task Force (MAGTF) assets defending forward combat areas, maneuver forces, vital areas, installations, and/or units engaged in special/independent operations.

History

1st Stinger Battery was initially activated on July 1, 1982, at Marine Corps Air Station, Futenma, Okinawa, Japan as 1st Forward Area Air Defense (FAAD) Battery, Marine Air Control Group 18, 1st Marine Aircraft Wing. Employing the Redeye missile and the newly fielded Stinger missile, the battery participated in numerous exercises throughout the Pacific Rim.

On October 1, 1986, the Battery was redesignated as 1st Low Altitude Air Defense (LAAD) Battalion. The battalion consisted of two firing batteries and a headquarters and service battery. During Operation Desert Storm, 1st LAAD Battalion deployed a Platoon (-) in the defense of Al Jabal Airfield.

On May 14, 1993, 1st LAAD Battalion was reduced in size and redesignated as 1st Stinger Battery. The Battery consists of two firing platoons and a headquarters and service platoon. In January 1996, the Battery fielded the Avenger Weapon System, increasing its firepower and targeting capabilities. Over the next several months, the Avengers and man-portable air defense system (MANPADS) vehicles will be phased-out and replaced with the Advanced-MANPADS.

1st Stinger Battery was the only Marine ground-based air defense unit within the III Marine Expeditionary Force. The Battery maintained an aggressive training program and operational tempo as its Marines supported exercises within the Western Pacific and operations with the 31st Marine Expeditionary Unit.  In early February 2007, 1st Stinger battery Marines deployed for the first time in support of Operation Iraqi Freedom.  Their mission was to provide airbase security while in Iraq for the next seven months.  The battery returned to Okinawa in August 2007 and on September 28, 2007, 1st Stinger Battery was decommissioned at a ceremony at MCAS Futenma.

Unit Deployment Program

Beginning in the Summer of 2013, Marine Corps low altitude air defense returned to III Marine Expeditionary Force in the form of rotations of LAAD Marines from the remaining CONUS Battalions, 2nd LAAD Battalion and 3rd LAAD Battalion, as part of the resumption of the Unit Deployment Program.  Attached to Marine Air Support Squadron 2, LAAD UDP Detachments support III MEF operational requirements for exercises and operations within the PACOM AOR as III MEF's only organic ground based air defense asset in theater.

See also
 List of United States Marine Corps aviation support units
 History of ground based air defense in the United States Marine Corps

References

External links
 1st Stinger’s official website

01
United States Marine Corps low altitude air defense units
AAA